Win Us Over is the fourth album by hard rock band ASG. The album was released on September 11, 2007.

Track listing 
All songs written and arranged by ASG.
"Right Death Before" (3:05)
"Dream Song" (3:50)
"Low End Insight" (4:20)
"Glow" (3:19)
"Coffee Depression Sunshine" (4:12)
"The Dull Blade" (4:50)
"Ballad of Richard K." (4:00)
"Taking Me Over" (3:11)
"A Number to Murder Two" (3:32)
"Gallop Song" (3:32)
"Palm Springs" (2:43)
"Win Us Over" (3:26)
"Bombs Away" (2:15)

"Dream Song" was featured in the soundtrack for the 2010 video game Splatterhouse; "The Dull Blade" was included in the Skate 2 soundtrack.

References

2007 albums
ASG (band) albums
Volcom Entertainment albums